Shahjahanian ( also spelled Shah Jahanian) is a village located in district of Gujrat, Pakistan. It is situated about 12 kilometers in north east of Gujrat.

References

Villages in Gujrat District